Louis Samuel Tsoutsouvas (July 4, 1915 – July 17, 2001) was an American football player and coach.  He served as the head football coach at Humboldt State College—now known as Humboldt State University—in 1948, compiling a record of 6–3.

Head coaching record

References

External links
 
 

1915 births
2001 deaths
American football centers
Humboldt State Lumberjacks football coaches
Pittsburgh Steelers players
Stanford Cardinal football players
Sportspeople from Fresno, California
Sportspeople from Santa Barbara, California
Coaches of American football from California
Players of American football from California